The Noose  is a Polish film released in 1958, directed by Wojciech Jerzy Has, and starring Gustaw Holoubek. The film is an adaptation of a short story by Marek Hłasko, and follows a day in the life of an alcoholic.

Plot
Kuba Kowalski (Gustaw Holoubek) is an alcoholic who spends most of his day in his room with a bottle of vodka for company and a noose dangling from the ceiling. His ruminations are periodically interrupted by his girlfriend Krystyna (Aleksandra Slaska) banging on the door.

Cast
  Gustaw Holoubek as Kuba Kowalski
  Aleksandra Śląska as Krystyna
  Teresa Szmigielówna as Kuba's old love
  Tadeusz Fijewski as Władek
  Stanisław Milski as Rybicki
  Władysław Dewoyno as Electrician Władek
  Tadeusz Gwiazdowski as Supt. Zenek
  Juliusz Grabowski as Waiter
  Marian Jastrzębski as Tailor
  Emil Karewicz as Waiter Gienek
  Roman Kłosowski as Electrician Janek
  Ignacy Machowski as Sergeant
  Helena Makowska-Fijewska as Barmaid
  Igor Przegrodzki as Kuba's friend
  Zygmunt Zintel as Harmonist Poldei

Release
Released on 20 January 1958, the film is Has's debut feature film and regarded as one of the most interesting film adaptations of Marek Hłasko's work and actor Gustaw Holoubek's first great work. The film's cynical vision ensured that communist authorities in Poland did not give it permission to be shown abroad.

See also
 Cinema of Poland
 List of Polish language films

References

External links
 

1958 films
Polish drama films
1950s Polish-language films
Films directed by Wojciech Has
Films based on short fiction
1958 drama films